The alligator snapping turtle (Macrochelys temminckii) is a large species of turtle in the family Chelydridae. The species is native to freshwater habitats in the United States. M. temminckii is one of the heaviest freshwater turtles in the world. It is the largest freshwater species of turtle in North America. It is often associated with, but not closely related to, the common snapping turtle, which is in the genus Chelydra. The specific epithet temminckii is in honor of Dutch zoologist Coenraad Jacob Temminck.

Taxonomy
Although it was once believed that only one extant species exists in the genus Macrochelys, recent studies have shown that there are two species, the other being the Suwannee snapping turtle (M. suwanniensis) of the Suwannee River. A third species, the Apalachicola snapping turtle (M. apalachicolae), has been proposed, but is generally not recognized.

The alligator snapping turtle is given its common name because of its immensely powerful jaws and distinct ridges on its shell that are similar in appearance to the rough, ridged skin of an alligator. It is also slightly less commonly known as "the loggerhead snapper" (not to be confused with the loggerhead sea turtle or loggerhead musk turtle).

Distribution and habitat
The alligator snapping turtle is found primarily in freshwaters of the southeastern United States. It is found from the Florida Panhandle west to East Texas, north to southeastern Kansas, Missouri, southeastern Iowa, western Illinois, southern Indiana, western Kentucky, Louisiana, and western Tennessee. Typically, only nesting females venture onto open land.

They are generally only found in bodies of water that flow into the Gulf of Mexico and usually do not occur in isolated wetlands or ponds.  A study found that the turtles prefer places with canopy cover, overhanging trees, shrubs, dead submerged trees, and beaver dens.

There are non-native established invasive populations of the alligator snapping turtle in South Africa. The average home range for an individual is 750 m. Females will have larger home ranges than males.

Description

The alligator snapping turtle is characterized by a large, heavy head, and a long, thick shell with three dorsal ridges of large scales (osteoderms), giving it a primitive appearance reminiscent of some of the plated dinosaurs, most notably Ankylosaurus. It can be immediately distinguished from the common snapping turtle by the three distinct rows of spikes and raised plates on the carapace, whereas the common snapping turtle has a smoother carapace. M. temminckii is a solid gray, brown, black, or olive-green in color, and often covered with algae. It has radiating yellow patterns around the eyes, serving to break up the outline of the eyes to keep the turtle camouflaged. The eyes are also surrounded by a star-shaped arrangement of fleshy, filamentous "eyelashes".

Though not verified, a  alligator snapping turtle was found in Kansas in 1937, but the largest verifiable one is debatable. One weighed at the Shedd Aquarium in Chicago was a 16-year resident giant alligator snapper weighing , sent to the Tennessee Aquarium as part of a breeding loan in 1999, where it subsequently died. Another weighing  was housed at the Brookfield Zoo in suburban Chicago. The species generally does not grow quite that large. Males are typically larger than females. 88 adult alligator snapping turtles averaged , 92 averaged , and 249 averaged . Among extant freshwater turtles, only the little-known giant softshell turtles of the genera Chitra, Rafetus, and Pelochelys, native to Asia, reach comparable sizes.

A mature male's cloaca extends beyond the carapace edge, a female's is placed exactly on the edge if not nearer to the plastron. The base of the tail of the male is also thicker as compared to that of the female because of the hidden reproductive organs.

The inside of the turtle's mouth is camouflaged, and it possesses a vermiform (worm-shaped) appendage on the tip of its tongue used to lure fish, a form of aggressive mimicry.

This turtle must be handled with extreme care and considered potentially dangerous. This species can bite through the handle of a broom and rare cases have been reported in which human fingers have been cleanly bitten off by the species. No human deaths have been reported to have been caused by the alligator snapping turtle.

Diet
The alligator snapping turtle is an opportunistic feeder that is almost entirely carnivorous. It relies on both live food caught by itself and dead organisms which it scavenges. In general, it will eat almost anything it can catch. Fishermen have glorified the species' ability to catch fish and to deplete fish populations, whereas in fact it largely targets any abundant and easily caught prey, and rarely has any extensive deleterious effect on fish populations. Its natural diet consists primarily of fish and fish carcasses, mollusks, carrion, and amphibians, but it is also known to eat snakes, snails, worms and other invertebrates, crawfish, insects, water birds, aquatic plants, other turtles and sometimes even small alligators. In one study conducted in Louisiana, 79.8% of the stomach contents of adult alligator snapping turtles was found to be composed of other turtles, although the resistance of shell and reptile-bone fragments to digestion may have led these fragments to remain longer in the digestive tract than other items. This species may also, on occasion, prey on aquatic rodents, including nutrias and muskrats or even snatch small to mid-sized other mammals, including squirrels, mice, opossums, raccoons, and armadillos when they attempt to swim or come near the water's edge.

The alligator snapping turtle seemingly most often hunts at night. It may also hunt diurnally, however. By day, it may try to attract fish and other prey by sitting quietly at the bottom of murky water and letting its jaws hang open to reveal its tongue appendage, which looks like a small, pink, worm in the back of its gray mouth, and lure the prey into striking distance. The vermiform tongue imitates the movements of a worm, luring prey to the turtle's mouth. The mouth is then closed with tremendous speed and force, completing the ambush. Although the turtle does not actively hunt its prey, it can detect chemosensory cues from prey, like the mud turtle in order to choose the location in which it is most likely to catch food. Small fish, such as minnows, are often caught in this way by younger alligator snapping turtles, whereas adults must eat a greater quantity per day and must forage more actively.  Though not a regular food source for them, adult alligator snappers have even been known to kill and eat small American alligators.

In captivity, it may consume almost any kind of meat provided, including beef, chicken, rabbit, and pork. It will refuse to eat if exposed to extremes in temperature.

Reproduction and lifespan
Maturity is reached around 12 years of age. Mating takes place yearly, in early spring in the southern part of its geographic range, and in later spring in the northern part. About two months later, the female builds a nest and lays a clutch of 10–50 eggs. The sex of the young depends on the temperature at which the eggs are incubated. This is called temperature dependent sex determination, and it is used by all turtle species to determine sex. For the alligator snapping turtle, higher temperatures produce more males in a clutch.  Nests are typically excavated at least 50 yards from the water's edge to prevent them from being flooded and drowned. Incubation takes from 100 to 140 days, and hatchlings emerge in the early fall.

Though its potential lifespan in the wild is unknown, the alligator snapping turtle is believed to be capable of living to 200 years of age, but 80 to 120 is more likely. In captivity, it typically lives between 20 and 70 years.

Predation
The alligator snapping turtle is most vulnerable to predators before and shortly after hatching. The eggs can be eaten by birds or mammals. The risk of predation decreases as the turtle gets bigger, so the adult turtle does not have as many predators.

Humans are also a threat to the alligator snapping turtle.

Under human care

The alligator snapping turtle is sometimes captive-bred as a pet and is readily available in the exotic animal trade. Due to its potential size and specific needs, it does not make a particularly good pet for any but the most experienced aquatic turtle keepers.

It prefers to feed on live fish, but will readily feed on other types of meat or leafy vegetables if offered. Hand feeding is dangerous. Extreme temperatures are known to affect the turtle's appetite and would result in the turtle refusing to feed until the temperature has been regulated.

Due to the turtle's sheer size, handling an adult specimen poses significant problems. With relative safety, a smaller turtle is held by the sides of its shell. A larger turtle, with its proportionately longer neck and greater reach, is held safely by grasping it just behind the head or close to the tail's base.

Despite its reputation, the alligator snapping turtle is typically not prone to biting. However, if provoked, it is quite capable of delivering a powerful bite which can easily amputate fingers or cause other significant injuries, such as cuts. Some U.S. states, where the alligator snapping turtle does not naturally occur (such as California), prohibit it from being kept as a pet by residents.

Invasive species
Some alligator snapping turtles were released or escaped into waters of the Czech Republic, Germany and Hungary. In Bavaria, a turtle was accused of causing injury to a child, but the claim was never substantiated and the turtle in question was never found. In Bohemia, four turtles of this species have been caught. In Hungary, one turtle was caught in the middle of a street near a lake. Certain EU countries have strong laws against keeping the alligator snapping turtle without permission, as it is  an invasive species.

Conservation status
 
Because of collection for the exotic pet trade, overharvesting for its meat, and habitat destruction, some states have imposed bans on collecting the alligator snapping turtle from the wild. The IUCN lists it as a threatened species, and as of 23 February 2023, it was listed as a CITES Appendix II species, meaning international trade (including in parts and derivatives) is regulated by the CITES permit system.

The alligator snapping turtle is now endangered in several states, including Indiana, Illinois, Kentucky, and Missouri, where it is protected by state law. It is designated as "in need of conservation" in Kansas.

In October 2013, one was found in the Prineville Reservoir in Oregon.  It was captured and euthanized by the Oregon Department of Fish and Wildlife, which considers alligator snapping turtles to be an invasive species. This one was the first found in the state.

References

External links

 Alligator vs. common snapping turtle – Chelydra.org
 
  Crunch, the alligator snapping turtle
  (in Czech).

Further reading
Behler JL, King FW (1979). The Audubon Society Field Guide to North American Reptiles and Amphibians. New York: Alfred A. Knopf. 743 pp. . (Macroclemys temmincki, pp. 436–437 + Plates 325, 326, 327).
Goin CJ, Goin OB, Zug GR (1978). Introduction to Herpetology, Third Edition. San Francisco: W.H. Freeman. xi + 378 pp. . (Macroclemys temmincki, pp. 77, 124, 256–257).
Powell R, Conant R, Collins JT (2016). Peterson Field Guide to Reptiles and Amphibians of Eastern and Central North America, Fourth Edition. Boston and New York: Houghton Mifflin Harcourt. xiv + 494 pp., 47 color plates, 207 figures. . (Macrochelys temminckii, p. 196, Figure 90 + Plates 14, 21). 
Smith HM, Brodie ED Jr (1982). Reptiles of North America: A Guide to Field Identification. New York: Golden Press. 240 pp. . (Macroclemys temmincki, pp. 38–39).
Troost G (1835). In: Harlan R (1835). Medical and Physical Researches: or Original Memoirs in Medicine, Surgery, Physiology, Geology, Zoology, and Comparative Anatomy. Philadelphia: L.R. Bailey. xxxix + 653 pp. (Chelonura temminckii, new species, p. 158).
Zim HS, Smith HM (1956). Reptiles and Amphibians: A Guide to Familiar American Species. Golden Nature Guides. New York: Simon and Schuster. 160 pp. (Macroclemys temmincki, pp. 25, 155).

Chelydridae
Apex predators
Aquatic reptiles
Reptiles of the United States
Endemic fauna of the United States
Fauna of the Southeastern United States
Reptiles described in 1835